St Mary's Church, Barkby is the Church of England Parish Church for Barkby, Leicestershire, England.  The church mostly dates from the 13th century.  It was grade I listed in 1966.

Bells

The church has six bells for bell ringing

Parish status
The church is part of The Fosse Team which comprises the following churches
St Mary's Church, Queniborough
St Hilda's Church, East Goscote
Holy Trinity Church, Thrussington
St Botolph's Church, Ratcliffe-on-the-Wreake
St Michael and All Angels’ Church, Rearsby
St Peter & St Paul, Syston
St Michael and All Angels’ Church, Thurmaston

References

Grade I listed churches in Leicestershire
Church of England church buildings in Leicestershire